The Greece women's national basketball team is the representative for Greece in international women's basketball competitions and is organized and run by the Greek Basketball Federation.

Participation in international competitions

Olympic Games

FIBA World Cup

EuroBasket Women

Mediterranean Games

Current roster

References

External links

 
FIBA profile

 
Women's national basketball teams
W